The Coppa Ciano was an automobile race held in Italy. Originally referred to as Coppa Montenero or Circuito Montenero, the Coppa Ciano name was officially in use between 1927 and 1939.

History

During the years immediately following World War I several road circuits were created in Italy. These included the Montenero Circuit at Livorno, which became home for the annual Coppa Montenero from its inauguration in 1921. In the beginning it was only a local affair and the organizers quickly found themselves in financial troubles. In 1923 the event was taken over by the Automobile Club of Italy and the future was secured.

In 1927, the Livorno-born  politician Costanzo Ciano donated a victory trophy: the Coppa Ciano. At first, this was awarded to the victor in a separate sports car race, run within a week of the Coppa Montenero. In 1929, however, the Coppa Ciano was merged into the main event and at the same time became the name most often used.

The driver Emilio Materassi won 4 years in a row 1925-1928 and earned the nickname "King of Montenero".

In the 1930s, Italian Hall of Fame driver Tazio Nuvolari won this race five times, more than any other driver. In his 1936 victory he made his way through the field, beating the otherwise superior German cars. This victory was one of the reasons leading to the Italian Grand Prix being held at the Montenero circuit in 1937, instead of the usual venue, Monza.

The 1939 race was run to Voiturette regulations and became the last before  World War II stopped all racing for many years.
In 1947 the 20th and final edition of the Coppa Montenero was run, with 1500 cc unsupercharged cars. At that point, due to Costanzo Ciano's connections with the now abolished Fascist regime, it was no longer called Coppa Ciano.

Coppa Ciano by year

See also
 Coppa Acerbo

External links
 Circuito del Montenero - Coppa Ciano (Italian)
 The Golden Era of Grand Prix Racing
 AIACR European Driver Championships 1931,1932, 1935-1939
 Formula One WC and non-championship results The Formula One Archives
 A forgotten Championship when Nuvolari waved the steering wheel at the crowd...

References

Auto races in Italy
Recurring sporting events established in 1927
Recurring events disestablished in 1939
Pre-World Championship Grands Prix